So-ra is a Korean feminine given name. Unlike most Korean given names, which are composed of two single-syllable Sino-Korean morphemes each written with one hanja, So-ra is an indigenous Korean name, a single two-syllable word meaning "conch shell". It is one of a number of such native names (called 고유어 이름) that have become more popular in South Korea in recent decades. In some cases, however, parents also choose to register hanja to represent the name, picking them solely for their pronunciation (for example, with hanja meaning "sunlight" and "net", respectively). There are 45 hanja with the reading "so" and 14 hanja with the reading "ra" on the South Korean government's official list of hanja which may used in given names.

List
Notable people with this name include:

Bak So-ra (fl. 1990s), South Korean voice actress
Choi Sora (born 1992), South Korean fashion model
Jung So-ra (born 1991), South Korean beauty pageant winner
Kang So-ra (born 1990), South Korean film actress
 Lee So-ra (disambiguation), multiple people, including:
Lee So-ra (model) (born 1969), South Korean model
Lee So-ra (singer) (born 1969), South Korean singer
Lee So-ra (tennis) (born 1994), South Korean tennis player
Lee So-ra (volleyball) (born 1987), South Korean volleyball player

See also
List of Korean given names
Sora Jung (Revised Romanization: Jeong Seora; born 1968), South Korean television actress

References

Korean feminine given names